"Sugar Rush" is a song by the Japanese girl idol group AKB48. It was released on October 30, 2012, on the original soundtrack of Wreck-It Ralph, which is titled  in Japanese.

Background 
The song was written for the Disney animation film Wreck-It Ralph and chosen as the ending theme for its worldwide release.

AKB48 members who participated 
The song features 10 AKB48 members: 
 Team A: Mariko Shinoda, Rina Kawaei, Minami Takahashi, Mayu Watanabe
 Team K: Tomomi Itano, Yuko Oshima
 Team B: Yuki Kashiwagi, Haruka Shimazaki, Haruna Kojima
 SKE48 Team S: Jurina Matsui

Writing credits 
 Lyrics: Yasushi Akimoto
 Music: Jamie Houston

Music video 
The music video was directed by Japanese photographer and filmmaker Mika Ninagawa, notably the director of another AKB48's music video, "Heavy Rotation".

The video was premiered on October 29, 2012, at the world premiere of the movie, which took place in Los Angeles.

Charts

Covers
In 2014, Mexican singer Thalía recorded an English language cover  of the song for her first children's album Viva Kids Vol. 1. A music video was released which features Thalía in an animated candyland.

References

External links 
 
 

Thalía songs
2010s ballads
2012 songs
2012 singles
AKB48 songs
Songs with lyrics by Yasushi Akimoto
Disney songs
Songs written for animated films
Japanese-language songs
Songs written by Jamie Houston (songwriter)
Walt Disney Records singles
Bubblegum pop songs
J-pop songs
Wreck-It Ralph